

517001–517100 

|-bgcolor=#f2f2f2
| colspan=4 align=center | 
|}

517101–517200 

|-id=104
| 517104 Redinger ||  || Larry Redinger is a retired Dean of Mt. San Antonio College, a public community college in Walnut, California. || 
|}

517201–517300 

|-bgcolor=#f2f2f2
| colspan=4 align=center | 
|}

517301–517400 

|-bgcolor=#f2f2f2
| colspan=4 align=center | 
|}

517401–517500 

|-bgcolor=#f2f2f2
| colspan=4 align=center | 
|}

517501–517600 

|-bgcolor=#f2f2f2
| colspan=4 align=center | 
|}

517601–517700 

|-bgcolor=#f2f2f2
| colspan=4 align=center | 
|}

517701–517800 

|-bgcolor=#f2f2f2
| colspan=4 align=center | 
|}

517801–517900 

|-bgcolor=#f2f2f2
| colspan=4 align=center | 
|}

517901–518000 

|-bgcolor=#f2f2f2
| colspan=4 align=center | 
|}

References 

517001-518000